Kamiel Maase (born 20 October 1971 in Nijmegen) is a retired long-distance runner from the Netherlands, who is the current Dutch record holder in the 5000 metres and 10,000 metres. He retired in January, 2009.

He placed 11th at the 2003 Rotterdam Marathon with a time of 2:10:28.

International competitions

References
 Personal website

1971 births
Living people
Sportspeople from Nijmegen
Dutch male long-distance runners
Dutch male cross country runners
Dutch male marathon runners
Olympic male long-distance runners
Olympic male marathon runners
Olympic athletes of the Netherlands
Athletes (track and field) at the 2000 Summer Olympics
Athletes (track and field) at the 2004 Summer Olympics
Athletes (track and field) at the 2008 Summer Olympics
Universiade gold medalists in athletics (track and field)
Universiade gold medalists for the Netherlands
Medalists at the 1997 Summer Universiade
World Athletics Championships athletes for the Netherlands
Russian Athletics Championships winners
21st-century Dutch people